Vilhelm Mariboe Aubert (29 December 1868  – 20 June 1908 ), commonly known by his nickname "Bille" Aubert, was a Norwegian jurist.

Personal life
Aubert was born in Christiania  (now Oslo),  Norway. He was a son of  the professor Ludvig Mariboe Benjamin Aubert (1838–1896) and  author Elise Aubert (1837–1909). Aubert"s sister was author Sofie Aubert Lindbæk (1875–1953).

Career
Aubert studied law at the University of Christiania where he was founding chairman of the Conservative Students' Association (Den Konservative Studenterforening) in 1891. He was also widely known as a speaker in the Norwegian Students' Society. In 1904, he was pronounced judge in Congo. Aubert died during 1908 in Stanleyville. From Congo, he wrote several letters to Norwegian newspapers, which were published together in a 1908 book titled Breve fra Kongo.

Works
Breve Fra Kongo Og Andetstedsfra  (1908)

References

1868 births
1908 deaths
Judges from Oslo
University of Oslo alumni
Norwegian expatriate judges
Norwegian expatriates in the Democratic Republic of the Congo
Belgian Congo judges
d'Aubert family